Willie Pickens (April 18, 1931 – December 12, 2017) was an American jazz pianist, composer, arranger, and educator.

Early life
Pickens was born in Milwaukee on April 18, 1931. He studied piano formally from the age of 14. He attended Lincoln High School in Milwaukee with saxophonist Bunky Green. Pickens also studied at the Wisconsin Conservatory of Music.

Later life and career
Pickens joined the army in 1951. He obtained a B.S. in music education from the University of Wisconsin–Milwaukee in 1958 and moved to Chicago in the same year.

In the early 1960s, Pickens played on saxophonist Eddie Harris' first four recordings for Vee-Jay Records. His period with Harris lasted between 1960 and 1966. Pickens taught music at public schools from 1966 until 1990. He was also a faculty member of the American Conservatory of Music between 1971 and 1987.

Pickens recorded with clarinetist Buddy DeFranco in 1977, and drummer Louis Bellson in 1994. Pickens played in drummer Elvin Jones' band between 1990 and 1997, including internationally.

According to The New Grove Dictionary of Jazz, "Pickens appeared regularly at international jazz festivals and performed at Chicago Jazz Festival almost yearly from its inception." For jazz musicians in Chicago, Pickens has become "a revered mentor to younger players and a symbol of the music itself", in the words of a Chicago Tribune commentator. He also taught at Northern Illinois University's School of Music. Saxophonist Lou Donaldson once told Donald Harrison, "Willie Pickens is one of the last great bebop pianists."

Pickens died of a heart attack in Manhattan, New York, at the age of 86.  His wife, Irma, died in 2015 after 55 years of marriage. A daughter, Bethany, also plays the piano professionally and has recorded with her father.

Discography
An asterisk (*) indicates that the year is that of release.

As leader/co-leader

As sideman

Main source:

References

External links

1931 births
2017 deaths
African-American jazz pianists
American male pianists
Musicians from Milwaukee
Military personnel from Milwaukee
University of Wisconsin–Milwaukee alumni
Wisconsin Conservatory of Music alumni
20th-century African-American musicians
21st-century African-American musicians
20th-century American pianists
21st-century American pianists
20th-century American male musicians
21st-century American male musicians
American male jazz musicians